Cándido Mesa (born 2 February 1964) is a Cuban wrestler. He competed in the men's Greco-Roman 130 kg at the 1992 Summer Olympics.

References

1964 births
Living people
Cuban male sport wrestlers
Olympic wrestlers of Cuba
Wrestlers at the 1992 Summer Olympics
Sportspeople from Havana
Pan American Games medalists in wrestling
Pan American Games gold medalists for Cuba
Wrestlers at the 1983 Pan American Games
20th-century Cuban people
21st-century Cuban people